Hakkı Emre Yunt (born 5 Mai 1962, Ankara) is a Turkish diplomat and the current Turkish ambassador to Sweden.

Education 
He studied in the Department of Public Administration of the Middle East Technical University from where he graduated in 1985. Following he absolved his military service between July 1986 and March 1987.

Diplomatic career 
Between 1988 and 1999 he was assigned in several positions to Turkish consulates and embassies of in Chicago, Teheran or Washington. Between 2001 and 2005 he was assigned to the Embassy of Beijing. From 2005 he was assigned to the diplomatic releations between Turkey and the European Union, eventually assuming as the  Head of Department of the Turkish Accession to the European Union in 2006. In 2009 he became the Turkish ambassador to Doha, Qatar, which he stayed until 2013. In 2017 he assumed as the Turkish ambassador to Sweden. 

In 2019, he was opposed to Peter Handke was awarded the Nobel Peace Prize who is a known supporter of Slobodan Milosevic and decided not to attend the Nobel Prize ceremony that year. 

As in May 2022 Sweden applied to become a member of NATO and the Turkish President Recep Tayyip Erdogan voiced opposition to the aim due to terrorists being represented in the Swedish Parliament, Yunt demanded the extradition of the Swedish MP Amineh Kakabaveh to Turkey. Kakabaveh responded that not she should be extradited to Turkey but the ambassador should be sent back to Turkey. Later, Yunt said the extradition was a misunderstanding as Turkey didn't make such a request.

Award 
2013, Sash of Merit from Qatar

References 

1962 births
Living people
21st-century Turkish diplomats
People from Ankara
Middle East Technical University alumni
Ambassadors of Turkey to Sweden
Ambassadors of Turkey to Qatar